Luton George Kieshawn Shelton (11 November 1985 – 22 January 2021) was a Jamaican professional footballer who played as a striker or winger.  At the time of his death, he was the top scorer for the Jamaican national football team with 35 goals.  He is also the only men's football player to score four goals in his international debut (2004).  He earned 75 caps for Jamaica, and played at three CONCACAF Gold Cups. 

Shelton attended Wolmer's Schools and began his career in the youth system of Harbour View.  In his international club career, he was part of championship sides in the 2006 Svenska Cupen and the 2008 Norwegian Cup. He also played in the UK, Denmark, Turkey, and Russia.

Club career

Harbour View
Shelton started his career in the Harbour View youth system before becoming a first regular by the age of 18. While at Harbour View he won the CFU Club Championship and the National Premier League. He was also recognised as youth player of the year during his tenure.

Helsingborg
In August 2005 Shelton was due to move to Football League Championship club Burnley after a successful pre-season trial. They attempted to sign Shelton, but a work permit was rejected, and in August 2006 he joined Helsingborg for about £100,000. During the 2006 season, he scored nine goals in 19 games in the Swedish Allsvenskan, despite playing only irregularly due to repeated injuries. He scored a total of 17 goals in 28 competitive matches, including five goals in four Swedish Cup matches on the way to Helsingborg's victory in the competition. His 120th-minute equaliser against to-be league champions Elfsborg in the quarter-final, which Helsingborg won 5–3 after a penalty shootout (4–4 after extra time), and the 1–0 goal in the final against Gefle, were two of his highlights at the club.

Sheffield United
Despite being signed amidst much fanfare, Shelton did not make his full début until April 2007 in a 2–0 loss to Manchester United at Old Trafford. He made only three more appearances for the Blades in the Premiership that season as they unsuccessfully battled to avoid relegation.

With the arrival of James Beattie and Billy Sharp at Bramall Lane during the close season he found games no more easy to come by under new manager Bryan Robson. Initially limited to cup appearances, he scored his first competitive goals for the club, netting twice in a 5–0 League Cup win over Morecambe in September 2007.

As the team struggled he began to see more first team action, but was unable to turn appearances into goals, scoring only twice more that season, against Manchester City in the FA Cup and Colchester in the league. With the arrival of new manager Kevin Blackwell Shelton was sidelined once more.

Vålerenga
On 24 July 2008, it was announced that Shelton had been sold to Norwegian side Vålerenga, playing in the Tippeligaen, for around £1m (10m kr).  His contract was to last to the end of the 2011 season.  Shelton made his debut on 2 August, scoring his side's lone goal in a 1–1 game at home against Fredrikstad FK. He was considered an attacking player with a speed advantage: he was the fastest player to run a 40m sprint in the Tippeligaen.  He played in the 2008 Norwegian Cup, and was one of their top scorers in the 2010 Tippeligaen season with 12 goals.

Shelton spent the 2009-2010 season on loan to the Danish side Aalborg BK, playing 11 games. He was part of their squad for the 2008–09 UEFA Cup.

Karabükspor and Volga Nizhny Novgorod 
On 4 August 2011, Shelton was transferred to Karabükspor.   He played for two years, and chose to retain his jersey number 78 when he moved.

In 2013, Shelton moved to FC Volga Nizhny Novgorod in Russia.  The club suffered from financial issues during this period, and frequently missed payments to the players.

Harbour View return
In April 2015, Shelton went on trial with MLS side Colorado Rapids.  Shelton returned to Harbour View at the beginning of 2017, after being out of the game for two years with injury, scoring in his first match on his return.  This match was his last before retirement.

International career
Shelton was capped at the U-17, U-20, U-23 and national levels for Jamaica. He scored his 25th goal for Jamaica vs Guadeloupe. He is the only man to score four goals on his international début.  In June 2008 he scored five goals in two 2010 FIFA World Cup qualifying games for Jamaica against the Bahamas. Later the same month, he scored two goals as Jamaica won 7–0 and scored a hat-trick as Jamaica won 6–0. Shelton was also the top goal scorer in 2010 CONCACAF World Cup qualification matches with seven goals. On 31 January 2010, Shelton scored in a friendly match against Canada to equal Paul Young as Jamaica's all-time leading goalscorer with 28 goals. On 27 November 2010, Shelton became Jamaica's all-time leader scorer with 30 goals after scoring two goals versus Antigua. Jamaica shocked United States 2–1 on to seize the lead in their group in the semi-final round of 2014 FIFA World Cup qualifying in the CONCACAF Zone. Goals from Rodolph Austin and Luton Shelton overcame Clint Dempsey's first-minute strike for the Americans as Jamaica posted their first victory over the US in 19 matches.

Personal life
Shelton had three children with his wife Bobbette.

In 2018, it was announced that Shelton had ALS. He died from complications of the disease on 22 January 2021, aged 35.

Career statistics

International
Source:

Honours
Harbour View
 CFU Club Championship: 2004

Helsingborg
 Svenska Cupen: 2006

Vålerenga
 Norwegian Cup: 2008

Aalborg BK
 Danish Cup runner-up: 2008–09
Jamaica
 Caribbean Cup: 2005, 2008, 2010

See also
 List of top international men's football goalscorers by country

References

External links

Profile at SUFC.premiumtv.co.uk
AaB profile

1985 births
2021 deaths
Jamaican footballers
Jamaica youth international footballers
Jamaica international footballers
Helsingborgs IF players
Sheffield United F.C. players
Vålerenga Fotball players
AaB Fodbold players
Harbour View F.C. players
FC Volga Nizhny Novgorod players
Allsvenskan players
Premier League players
English Football League players
Danish Superliga players
Eliteserien players
Russian Premier League players
Jamaican expatriate footballers
Expatriate footballers in Sweden
Expatriate footballers in England
Expatriate footballers in Norway
Expatriate men's footballers in Denmark
Expatriate footballers in Russia
Jamaican expatriate sportspeople in Norway
Jamaican expatriate sportspeople in Sweden
Jamaican expatriate sportspeople in England
Association football forwards
Sportspeople from Kingston, Jamaica
2005 CONCACAF Gold Cup players
2009 CONCACAF Gold Cup players
2011 CONCACAF Gold Cup players
Süper Lig players
Neurological disease deaths in Jamaica
Deaths from motor neuron disease